The 2022 City of Bradford Metropolitan District Council election took place on 5 May 2022 to elect one third of councillors to the City of Bradford Metropolitan District Council. The election took place at the same time as  other local elections across the United Kingdom.

In the previous council election in 2021, Labour maintained its control of the council, holding 51 seats after the election. The Conservatives formed the main opposition with twenty-five seats, with the remaining seats held by the Liberal Democrats, Green Party and independent councillors. Labour held the council, increasing its majority by one.

Background 

The Local Government Act 1972 created a two-tier system of metropolitan counties and districts covering Greater Manchester, Merseyside, South Yorkshire, Tyne and Wear, the West Midlands, and West Yorkshire starting in 1974. Bradford was a district of the West Yorkshire metropolitan county. The Local Government Act 1985 abolished the metropolitan counties, with metropolitan districts taking on most of their powers as metropolitan boroughs. The West Yorkshire Combined Authority was established in 2014 and began electing the mayor of West Yorkshire in 2021.

Since its formation, Bradford has been variously under Labour control, Conservative control and no overall control. Councillors have predominantly been elected from the Labour Party, Conservative Party and the Liberal Democrats. The Green Party gained their first councillors on Bradford Council in 2002 and following these elections became the joint third largest group on the council.

Labour regained control of the council from no overall control in the 2014 council election, gaining one seat to hold 46 out of 90 seats on the council. The Labour Party maintained its majority on the council in subsequent elections. In the most recent election in 2021, Labour won fifteen seats on 40.9% of the vote, the Conservatives won eleven seats on 30.3% of the vote, the Liberal Democrats won three seats on 8.1% of the vote, and independents and the Green Party won two seats each on 7.3% and 11.8% of the vote respectively. Three Conservative councillors—Joan Clarke, Robert Hargreaves and Luke Majkowski—left their party to sit as independents in 2021 and 2022, citing internal issues in the local branch of the Conservative Party.

Positions up for election in 2022 were last elected in 2018. In that election, twenty Labour councillors, eight Conservative councillors and two Liberal Democrat councillors were elected.

Electoral process 

The council elects its councillors in thirds, with a third being up for election every year for three years, with no election in the fourth year. The election will take place by first-past-the-post voting, with wards generally being represented by three councillors, with one elected in each election year to serve a four-year term.

All registered electors (British, Irish, Commonwealth and European Union citizens) living in Bradford aged 18 or over will be entitled to vote in the election. People who live at two addresses in different councils, such as university students with different term-time and holiday addresses, are entitled to be registered for and vote in elections in both local authorities. Voting in-person at polling stations will take place from 07:00 to 22:00 on election day, and voters will be able to apply for postal votes or proxy votes in advance of the election.

Previous council composition 

Changes:
 2021: Robert Hargreaves leaves Conservatives to sit as an independent
 January 2022: Luke Majkowski and Joan Clarke leave Conservatives to sit as independents

Result summary

Notes

Ward results

Baildon

Bingley

Bingley Rural

Bolton & Undercliffe

Bowling & Barkerend

Bradford Moor

City

Clayton & Fairweather Green

Craven

Eccleshill

Great Horton

Heaton

Idle & Thackley

Ilkley

Keighley Central

Keighley East

Keighley West

Little Horton

Manningham

Queensbury

Royds

Shipley

Thornton & Allerton

Toller

Tong

Wharfedale

Wibsey

Windhill & Wrose

Worth Valley

Wyke

References 

City of Bradford Metropolitan District Council elections
Bradford